Stefan is a surname of German or Austrian origin, and may refer to:

 Gary Stefan (born 1959), Canadian ice hockey player
 Greg Stefan (born 1961), Canadian ice hockey player
 Joseph Stefan (1835-1893), Austrian physicist
 Karl Stefan (1884-1951), American politician
 Oleg Stefan (born 1959), American actor
 Verena Stefan (1947–2017), Swiss-born feminist and writer

See also
 Stefan (given name), a masculine given name
 Brian Kim Stefans (born 1969), U.S. poet